The third series of the British medical drama television series Holby City commenced airing in the United Kingdom on BBC One on 5 October 2000, and concluded on 6 June 2001.

Production
Following its second series run of 16 episodes, the third series of Holby City ran for an extended 30 hour-long episodes. The series initially aired on Thursday nights on BBC One, before moving back to its original Tuesday night timeslot. The show's scope was expanded with the addition of a children's ward, allowing for greater diversification in patient storylines. While the series was in production, creator Mal Young deemed Holby City "the first successful new BBC1 one-hour drama format", in contrast to the failed programmes Harbour Lights and Sunburn. Although Young had once favoured soap opera stars in his casting, he reversed his position, explaining: "We're all guilty of grabbing a face, but it's a short-term gimmick. Viewers see right through it. It's the scripts that count. On the other hand, the soaps are so prevalent it's hard to find someone who hasn't been in one."

Reception
Matt Wells and Maggie Brown of The Guardian opined in September 2000, while the series was in production: "Series such as Holby are what the BBC really needs, the fresh but reliable mid-week regular drama that ITV is best at."

Cast

Main characters 
Colette Brown as Sam Kennedy (from episode 19)
Peter de Jersey as Steve Waring (from episode 2)
Jeremy Edwards as Danny Shaughnessy
Lisa Faulkner as Victoria Merrick (until episode 26)
Angela Griffin as Jasmine Hopkins (until episode 30)
Tina Hobley as Chrissie Williams (from episode 30)
George Irving as Anton Meyer
Thusitha Jayasundera as Tash Bandara

Clive Mantle as Mike Barratt (until episode 30)
Dawn McDaniel as Kirstie Collins (until episode 6)
Anna Mountford as Keri McGrath (from episode 2)
Jan Pearson as Kath Shaughnessy
Siobhan Redmond as Janice Taylor (from episode 2)
Laura Sadler as Sandy Harper (from episode 1)
Jeremy Sheffield as Alex Adams (from episode 1)
Nicola Stephenson as Julie Fitzjohn (until episode 29)

Recurring and guest characters 
Jan Anderson as Chloe Hill (episode 19)
Paul Blackthorne as Guy Morton (episodes 18-30)
Tilly Blackwood as Emma Waring (from episode 12)
George Costigan as James Campbell (episodes 24-30)
Hari Dhillon as Sunil Gupta (from episode 26)
Kulvinder Ghir as Anil Banerjee (from episode 8)
Marvin Humes as Robbie Waring (from episode 2)

Kwame Kwei-Armah as Fin Newton (episodes 10 and 29)
Andrew Lewis as Paul Rose (from episode 3)
Deborah Poplett as Anna Chandler (from episode 17)
Patrick Ryecart as Ewan Littlewood (episodes 3-30)
Paul Shane as Stan Ashleigh (from episode 5)
Sheridan Smith as Miranda Locke (episodes 25−30)
David Soul as Alan Fletcher (episode 23)
Simon Williams as Charles Merrick (episodes 8-27)

Episodes

Notes

References

External links
 Holby City series 3 (2000) at BBC Online
 Holby City series 3 (2001) at BBC Online
 Holby City series 3 at the Internet Movie Database

03
2000 British television seasons
2001 British television seasons